Karaoke Remix Vol.1 is a compilation album by the German Heavy metal group Helloween.
It was only released in Japan. It features instrumental tracks from the Kai Hansen and Michael Kiske eras.

Track listing 

Helloween compilation albums
1998 remix albums
1998 compilation albums